The eastern mountains tree frog (Litoria dorsivena) is a species of frog in the subfamily Pelodryadinae. It is endemic to Papua New Guinea. Its natural habitats are subtropical or tropical moist montane forests and rivers.

References

Litoria
Amphibians of Papua New Guinea
Taxonomy articles created by Polbot
Amphibians described in 1968